Zach McGowan (born May 5, 1980) is an American film, television and voice actor. He is known for his roles in television series Agents of S.H.I.E.L.D. as Anton Ivanov/The Superior, Shameless,
Black Sails, and The 100. Other highlights include parts in the films Terminator Salvation, The Hunt for Eagle One, and the sequel The Hunt for Eagle One: Crash Point. He guest-starred in the television series Numbers, CSI: Miami, and Cold Case, with voice-over work for the Scream Awards, Animal Planet and the video games Tom Clancy's Ghost Recon: Future Soldier, Resident Evil: Operation Raccoon City, and Iron Man.

Early life

McGowan was raised in New York. He attended Ethical Culture Fieldston School from kindergarten through senior year in high school, where he was the captain of the football and ice hockey teams and a member of the drama and theater societies. He graduated in 2002 from Carleton College. He is a 2nd-generation Irish-American Jew.

Career
In mid-2011, McGowan joined the cast of the Showtime dramedy Shameless, as Jody, first as a guest star (Season 2) and then as a series regular (Season 3). Season two premiered January 8, 2012. He said that modeling for art students helped him for the role and now "nudity is just part of the job".

In July 2013, McGowan joined the cast of the Universal Pictures feature film Dracula Untold, playing Shkelgim, a mysterious Romani.

In January 2014, McGowan joined the cast of the Starz dramatic adventure TV series Black Sails, playing a fictionalized version of the real-life 18th-century English pirate Charles Vane. The role called for an English actor, so McGowan, an American, affected an accent. Casting directors found out later that McGowan was faking but were impressed with his performance and chose him for the role.

In July 2016, McGowan joined the cast of The CW science fiction TV series The 100, playing King Roan of the Ice Nation, after having previously played the role as a guest star.

In January 2017, McGowan joined the cast of the ABC TV series Agents of S.H.I.E.L.D., playing villain The Superior.

In March 2018, McGowan joined the cast of L.A.'s Finest, a TV series based on the Bad Boys franchise, alongside Jessica Alba and Gabrielle Union.

Personal life
McGowan is not related to Rose McGowan.

He married Emily Johnson on September 27, 2008, in the Santa Barbara mountains.

Filmography

Film

Television

Video games

References

External links

Living people
American male film actors
American male television actors
American male voice actors
Male actors from New York (state)
1980 births